Warneet is a town in Victoria, Australia,  south-east of Melbourne's Central Business District, located within the City of Casey local government area.

Warneet is located at the head of the large bay of Western Port.

For education, most children go to Tooradin Primary School or Koo Wee Rup Secondary College.

History

Warneet Post Office opened on 1 July 1959 and closed in 1993.

Transport

Melbourne bus routes operate regularly with several stops located within the town. The town is also easily accessible by car via the South Gippsland Highway, however there is no train station in the town.

See also
 City of Cranbourne – Warneet was previously within this former local government area.

References

Towns in Victoria (Australia)
Coastal towns in Victoria (Australia)
Western Port
1993 disestablishments in Australia
1959 establishments in Australia
City of Casey